The Illinois Department of Human Services (IDHS) is the department of the Illinois state government responsible for providing a wide variety of safety net services to Illinois residents in poverty, who are facing other economic challenges, or who have any of a variety of disabilities. As of 2006, it was the largest administrative agency of the state of Illinois in terms of state employee headcount, with 14,057 employees.

Structure
The following subdepartments are listed alphabetically:

 The Division of Community Health & Prevention attempts to maintain the health of existing family structures in Illinois by staffing efforts to contain domestic violence and maximize prenatal care and child care and welfare.
 The Division of Developmental Disabilities provides community and residential services to persons with developmental disabilities.  In 2006, the division had approximately 45,000 clients.
 The Division of Human Capital Development is the primary welfare agency of the state of Illinois.  It oversees programs such as TANF and food stamps.
 The Division of Mental Health provides community and residential services to persons with challenges of mental health.

It also includes:

 The Office of Alcoholism & Substance Abuse provides community care for persons with challenges related to alcoholism and substance abuse.
 The Office of Rehabilitation Services provides community services to persons with disabilities.  In 2006, the Office had approximately 230,000 clients.
 The Office of Strategic Planning and Performance Management coordinates divisional program planning and performance management.
 The Office of Security and Emergency Preparedness ensures the safety and readiness of the agency's facilities, staff, customers and visitors

References

External links
 Illinois Department of Human Services
 TITLE 89: SOCIAL SERVICES of the Illinois Administrative Code

Human Services